German submarine U-372 was a Type VIIC U-boat built for Nazi Germany's Kriegsmarine for service during World War II.
She was laid down on 17 November 1939 by Kriegsmarinewerft Kiel as construction number 3, launched on 8 March 1941 and commissioned on 19 April 1941 under Kapitänleutnant Heinz-Joachim Neumann.

Design
German Type VIIC submarines were preceded by the shorter Type VIIB submarines. U-372 had a displacement of  when at the surface and  while submerged. She had two shafts and two  propellers.

U-372 was fitted with five  torpedo tubes (four fitted at the bow and one at the stern), fourteen torpedoes, one  SK C/35 naval gun, 220 rounds, and a  C/30 anti-aircraft gun. The boat had a complement of between forty-four and sixty.

Service history
The boat's career began with training at 1st U-boat Flotilla on 19 April 1941, followed by active service on 1 July 1941 as part of the 1st Flotilla until 13 December 1941, when she joined 29th U-boat Flotilla for operations in the Mediterranean.

Fate
All hands survived.

Wolfpacks
U-372 took part in three wolfpacks, namely:
 Brandenburg (15 September – 1 October 1941)
 Störtebecker (16 – 19 November 1941)
 Steuben (19 November – 2 December 1941)

Summary of raiding history

See also
 Mediterranean U-boat Campaign (World War II)

References

Notes

Citations

Bibliography

External links

German Type VIIC submarines
1941 ships
U-boats commissioned in 1941
U-boats sunk in 1942
U-boats sunk by depth charges
U-boats sunk by British warships
U-boats sunk by British aircraft
World War II shipwrecks in the Mediterranean Sea
World War II submarines of Germany
Ships built in Kiel
Maritime incidents in August 1942